Gordon Sylvester Bradshaw Mack (known as Curly Mack) (1898-1948), was a male badminton player from Ireland.

Profile
He won the All England Open Badminton Championships, considered as the unofficial World Badminton Championships, in men's singles in 1930.  In total, he won eight All England Open Badminton Championships titles between 1923 and 1931, six of them in men's doubles, one in men's singles and one in mixed doubles.

He also won twelve Irish Open titles.

References 

Irish male badminton players
1898 births
1948 deaths